Lee Jin-sook (born 17 June 1960) is a South Korean professor of architectural engineering at Chungnam National University (CNU) currently serving as its 19th president - the first woman to become the president of CNU and any Flagship Korean National Universities.

Lee has been teaching at CNU from 1989. Since then, she has taken various roles in her university such as dean of its Department of Architectural Engineering and College of Engineering and Graduate School of Industry, its Director of Office of International Affairs  and the president of council of CNU women professors. She is the second CNU head whose alma mater includes CNU.

Lee has also taken multiple advisory roles to the government participating in Presidential Advisory Council on Science and Technology and Presidential Committee on Architecture Policy as well as sub-committees of Ministry of Land, Infrastructure and Transport, Ministry of Environment, Ministry of the Interior and Safety, now-Ministry of Agriculture, Food and Rural Affairs, now Ministry of Science and ICT and National Agency for Administrative City Construction. She also took advisory roles to local governments of Daejeon Metropolitan City where CNU resides and nearby South Chungcheong Province.

She was also the president of Korea Society of Lighting and Visual Environment and Korea Society of Color Studies.

Lee is the first CNU president directly elected by all members of CNU - its academic staff, administrative staff and students. In the first round of CNU-president-election, she ranked second scoring 22.55% of the total votes by earning the most votes from administrative staff, TAs and students. In the second round, she earned 52.34% of the votes. Her nomination was approved by Ministry of Education and confirmed by President Moon Jae-in.

She holds the bachelor's in architectural engineering education and master's in architectural planning from CNU and a doctorate degree in architectural environment planning from Tokyo Institute of Technology.

References 

Living people
Tokyo Institute of Technology alumni
1960 births
Heads of universities and colleges in Asia
Academic staff of Chungnam National University
South Korean women academics
South Korean women engineers